Fong may refer to:
the Bulu tribe of the Beti–Pahuin people of Cameroon
various Chinese surnames
the Hong Kong Government Cantonese romanization of the surname Fāng
the Taishanese pronunciation of the Chinese surname Kuàng
a Malaysian–Singaporean form of Féng (
a Taiwanese form of Fèng

List of people with the surname
Ching-Yao Fong, Chinese physicist
Cory Fong (born 1972)

Unspecified
Adam Fong (born 1980), California futuristic composer
Alec Fong Lim (1931–1990)
Angela Fong (born 1985)
Christian Fong (born 1977)
Craig Fong  (born 1970)
Danielle Fong (sport shooter) (born 1991)
Danielle Fong (born 1987), co-founder and chief scientist of LightSail Energy
Evan Fong (born 1992)
Fong Chi Chung (born 1968)
Fong Yee Pui (born 1991), Hong Kong sprinter
Gary Fong (born 1960)
Grace Fong
Harold Michael Fong (1938–1995)
Heather Fong (born 1956)
Ivan K. Fong (born 1961)
Katrina Fong Lim (born 1961)
Larry Fong
Leo Fong (1928-2022)
Les Fong (born 1956)
Luise Fong (born 1964), Malaysian-born New Zealand artist
Martin Fong
Mei Fong
Nathan Fong (1959-2020), Canadian chef
Neale Fong
Nickson Fong (born 1969)
Robert Fong (born 1960)
Sandra Fong (born 1990)
Sunny Fong (born 1976)

芳-方(Fāng)
Adderly Fong (born 1990)
Alex Fong (actor) (born 1963)
Alex Fong (singer) (born 1980), professional swimmer-turned-actor and singer based in Hong Kong
Allen Fong (born 1947)
Ben Fong-Torres (born 1945)
Dennis Fong (born 1977)
Edsel Ford Fong (1927–1984)
Fong Kui Lun (born 1946)
Fong Pak Lun (born 1993)
Fong Sai-yuk
Fong Sai-yuk
Hiram Fong (1906–2004), U.S. Senator from Hawaii (1959–1977)
Kevin Fong (born 1971)
Khalil Fong (born 1983), soul music singer-songwriter signed to the Warner Music label in Hong Kong
Lung Fong (1954–2008)
Margaret Fong (born 1963)
Matt Fong (1953–2011), California politician
Mona Fong (born 1931)
Nellie Fong (born 1949)
Paul Fong (born 1952), California politician
Shirley Fong-Torres (1946–2011)

鳳 (Fèng)
Fong Fei-fei (1953–2012)

冯 (Féng)
Fong Chan Onn (born 1944)
Fong Po Kuan (born 1973)

邝 and 鄺 (Kuàng)
Arthur Fong (born 1964)
Benson Fong (1916–1987)

See also
Fang (surname)
Kuang (surname)

Multiple Chinese surnames